George Saunders (born December 2, 1958) is an American writer of short stories, essays, novellas, children's books, and novels. His writing has appeared in The New Yorker, Harper's, McSweeney's, and GQ. He also contributed a weekly column, American Psyche, to The Guardian's weekend magazine between 2006 and 2008.

A professor at Syracuse University, Saunders won the National Magazine Award for fiction in 1994, 1996, 2000, and 2004, and second prize in the O. Henry Awards in 1997. His first story collection, CivilWarLand in Bad Decline, was a finalist for the 1996 PEN/Hemingway Award. In 2006, Saunders received a MacArthur Fellowship and won the World Fantasy Award for his short story "CommComm".

His story collection In Persuasion Nation was a finalist for the Story Prize in 2007. In 2013, he won the PEN/Malamud Award and was a finalist for the National Book Award. Saunders's Tenth of December: Stories won the 2013 Story Prize for short-story collections and the inaugural (2014) Folio Prize. His novel Lincoln in the Bardo (Bloomsbury Publishing) won the 2017 Booker Prize.

Early life and education
Saunders was born in Amarillo, Texas. He grew up in Oak Forest, Illinois, near Chicago, attended St. Damian Catholic School and graduated from Oak Forest High School in Oak Forest, Illinois. He spent some of his early 20s working as a roofer in Chicago, a doorman in Beverly Hills, and a slaughterhouse knuckle-puller. In 1981, he received a B.S. in geophysical engineering from Colorado School of Mines in Golden, Colorado. Of his scientific background, Saunders has said, "any claim I might make to originality in my fiction is really just the result of this odd background: basically, just me working inefficiently, with flawed tools, in a mode I don't have sufficient background to really understand. Like if you put a welder to designing dresses."

In 1988, he was awarded an M.A. in creative writing from Syracuse University, where he worked with Tobias Wolff. At Syracuse, he met Paula Redick, a fellow writer, whom he married. Saunders recalled, "we [got] engaged in three weeks, a Syracuse Creative Writing Program record that, I believe, still stands".

Of his influences, Saunders has written:

Career

Background and work
From 1989 to 1996, Saunders worked as a technical writer and geophysical engineer for Radian International, an environmental engineering firm in Rochester, New York. He also worked for a time with an oil exploration crew in Sumatra in the early 1980s.

Since 1997, Saunders has been on the faculty of Syracuse University, teaching creative writing in the school's MFA program while continuing to publish fiction and nonfiction. In 2006, he was awarded a Guggenheim Fellowship and a $500,000 MacArthur Fellowship. He was a Visiting Writer at Wesleyan University and Hope College in 2010 and participated in Wesleyan's Distinguished Writers Series and Hope College's Visiting Writers Series. His nonfiction collection, The Braindead Megaphone, was published in 2007.

Saunders's fiction often focuses on the absurdity of consumerism, corporate culture, and the role of mass media. Many reviewers mention his writing's satirical tone, but his work also raises moral and philosophical questions. The tragicomic element in his writing has earned Saunders comparisons to Kurt Vonnegut, whose work has inspired him.

Saunders has also written a feature-length screenplay based on his short story "Sea Oak".

Saunders considered himself an Objectivist in his twenties but now views the philosophy unfavorably, likening it to neoconservatism. He is a student of Nyingma Buddhism.

Awards
Saunders has won the National Magazine Award for Fiction four times: in 1994, for "The 400-Pound CEO" (published in Harper's); in 1996, for "Bounty" (also published in Harper's); in 2000, for "The Barber's Unhappiness" (published in The New Yorker); and in 2004, for "The Red Bow" (published in Esquire). Saunders won second prize in the 1997 O. Henry Awards for his short story "The Falls", initially published in the January 22, 1996, issue of The New Yorker.

His first short-story collection, CivilWarLand in Bad Decline, was a finalist for the 1996 PEN/Hemingway Award.

In 2001, Saunders received a Lannan Literary Fellowship in Fiction from the Lannan Foundation.

In 2006, Saunders was awarded a Guggenheim Fellowship. Also that year, he received a MacArthur Fellowship; his short-story collection In Persuasion Nation was a finalist for The Story Prize; and he won the World Fantasy Award for Best Short Story for his short story "CommComm", first published in the August 1, 2005, issue of The New Yorker.

In 2009, Saunders received an award from the American Academy of Arts and Letters. In 2014, he was elected to the American Academy of Arts and Sciences.

In 2013, Saunders won the PEN/Malamud Award for Excellence in the Short Story. His short-story collection Tenth of December won the 2013 Story Prize. The collection also won the inaugural Folio Prize in 2014, "the first major English-language book prize open to writers from around the world". The collection was also a finalist for the National Book Award and was named one of the "10 Best Books of 2013" by the editors of the New York Times Book Review. In a January 2013 cover story, The New York Times Magazine called Tenth of December "the best book you'll read this year". One of the stories in the collection, "Home", was a 2011 Bram Stoker Award finalist.

In 2017, Saunders published his first novel, Lincoln in the Bardo, which won the Booker Prize and was a New York Times bestseller.

Awards and honors

Awards won
 National Magazine Award for Fiction, 1994 – "The 400-Pound CEO", short story, published in Harper's Magazine
 National Magazine Award for Fiction, 1996 – "Bounty", short story, published in Harper's Magazine
 National Magazine Award for Fiction, 2000 – "The Barber's Unhappiness", short story, published in The New Yorker
 National Magazine Award for Fiction, 2004 – "The Red Bow", short story, published in Esquire
 Second prize in the 1997 O. Henry Awards – "The Falls", short story, published in The New Yorker (January 22, 1996 issue)
 Lannan Foundation – Lannan Literary Fellowship, 2001
 MacArthur Fellowship, 2006
 Guggenheim Fellowship, 2006
 American Academy of Arts and Letters, Academy Award, 2009
 World Fantasy Award for Best Short Story – "CommComm", published in The New Yorker (August 1, 2005 issue)
 PEN/Malamud Award for Excellence in the Short Story, 2013
 The Story Prize, 2013 – Tenth of December: Stories
 Folio Prize, 2014 – Tenth of December: Stories
 The New York Times Book Review, "10 Best Books of 2013", Tenth of December: Stories
 American Academy of Arts and Sciences, Elected as Member, 2014
 Booker Prize, 2017 – Lincoln in the Bardo
 American Academy of Arts and Letters, Inducted as Member, 2018
 Premio Gregor von Rezzori, 2018
 Kulturhuset Stadsteatern International Literary Prize, 2018

Finalist honors
 PEN/Hemingway Award, 1996 – Finalist – CivilWarLand in Bad Decline
 The Story Prize, 2006 – Finalist – In Persuasion Nation
 National Book Award for Fiction, 2014 – Finalist – Tenth of December: Stories
 Bram Stoker Award, 2011 – Finalist – "Home" (short story)

Works

Novels
 Lincoln in the Bardo (2017)

Short fiction
 CivilWarLand in Bad Decline (1996) (short stories and a novella)
 Pastoralia (2000) (short stories and a novella)
 In Persuasion Nation (2006) (short stories)
 Tenth of December: Stories (2013) (short stories)
 Liberation Day: Stories (2022) (short stories)

Other

Essays and reporting

Anthologies
 Fakes: An Anthology of Pseudo-Interviews, Faux-Lectures, Quasi-Letters, "Found" Texts, and Other Fraudulent Artifacts, edited by David Shields and Matthew Vollmer (2012)
 Cappelens Forslags Conversational Lexicon Volume II, edited by Pil Cappelen Smith, published by Cappelens Forslag (2016) ISBN 978-82-999643-4-0

Interviews 
 "Choose Your Own Adventure: A Conversation With Jennifer Egan and George Saunders". New York Times Magazine, November 2015.
 "A Conversation with George Saunders". Image Journal, 2016.
 "George Saunders: The Art of Fiction No. 245". The Paris Review, issue 231 (Winter 2019).
 "An Interview with George Saunders". Believer Magazine, January 2021.
 "George Saunders on A Swim in a Pond in the Rain." Mayday, March 2021.

Notes

References

External links
 
 "George Saunders Has Written the Best Book You'll Read This Year", Joel Lovell, The New York Times Magazine, January 3, 2013
 10 Free Stories by George Saunders Available on the Web
 "Adjust Your Vision: Tolstoy's Last and Darkest Novel", George Saunders, NPR, January 6, 2013
 "Radio Interview with George Saunders" on Read First, Ask Later (Ep. 27 – Season Finale) 2014 - college radio book talk show - Lehigh Carbon Community College
 "George Saunders: On Story", by Sarah Klein & Tom Mason, Redglass Pictures, The Atlantic, December 8, 2015

1958 births
20th-century American non-fiction writers
20th-century American novelists
20th-century American short story writers
21st-century American non-fiction writers
21st-century American novelists
21st-century American short story writers
American male essayists
American male non-fiction writers
American male novelists
American male short story writers
American speculative fiction writers
Booker Prize winners
Colorado School of Mines alumni
Critics of neoconservatism
Critics of Objectivism (Ayn Rand)
Former Objectivists
Granta people
Living people
MacArthur Fellows
Nyingma Buddhists
PEN/Malamud Award winners
People from Amarillo, Texas
Postmodern writers
Syracuse University alumni
Syracuse University faculty
The New Yorker people
Wesleyan University faculty
World Fantasy Award-winning writers
Writers from Chicago
Writers from Texas
20th-century American male writers
21st-century American male writers
Members of the American Academy of Arts and Letters